Chris or Christopher Reed may refer to:
Christopher Robert Reed (born 1942), American historian
Christopher Reed (politician) (born 1972), American politician
Chris Reed (figure skater) (1989–2020), Japanese ice dancer 
Chris Reed (baseball) (born 1990), baseball pitcher 
Chris Reed (American football) (born 1992), American football guard
Chris Reed (marksman) (fl. 2000s–2010s), American competitive shooter

See also
Chris Reid (disambiguation)
Chris Read (born 1978), cricketer
Christopher Read, British historian of the Soviet Union